Anbarutak (also Romanized as ‘Anbarūtak) is a village in Hoseynabad-e Goruh Rural District, Rayen District, Kerman County, Kerman Province, Iran. At the 2006 census, its population was 46, in 13 families.

References 

Populated places in Kerman County